Prunum redfieldii is a species of sea snail, a marine gastropod mollusk in the family Marginellidae, the margin snails.

Description

Distribution
P. redfieldii can be found in the waters off the Florida Keys.

References

Marginellidae
Gastropods described in 1882